Haggard is an unincorporated community in Gray County, Kansas, United States.

History
A post office was opened in Haggard in 1914, and remained in operation until 1954.

Economy
The Gray County Wind Farm near Haggard is the largest wind farm in Kansas.

References

Further reading

External links
 Gray County maps: Current, Historic, KDOT

Unincorporated communities in Gray County, Kansas
Unincorporated communities in Kansas